Davud Pasha (sometimes spelled Da'ud Pasha; died September 1549) was an Ottoman statesman who was the Ottoman governor of Egypt from April 1538 to September 1549.

He was a good friend of his predecessor of the office, Hadım Suleiman Pasha, who helped him get the position. The two men shared a long-standing feud with Rüstem Pasha.

Davud Pasha died in office in September 1549, after holding the Egypt governorship for over 11 years.

See also
 List of Ottoman governors of Egypt

References

Ottoman governors of Egypt
16th-century Ottoman governors of Egypt
Pashas
1549 deaths
Year of birth unknown